Ken'ichirō, Kenichirō, Kenichiro or Kenichirou (written: , ,  or ) is a masculine Japanese given name. Notable people with the name include:

, Japanese professional wrestler
, Japanese video game composer and electronic musician
, Japanese sport wrestler
, Japanese conductor and composer
, Japanese voice actor
, Japanese footballer
, Japanese footballer
, Japanese politician
KENN (real name , Japanese voice actor and singer

Japanese masculine given names